Félix Nzouango Bikien (born 7 January 2003) is a French footballer who plays as a defender for  club Juventus Next Gen.

Career 
In 2018, Nzouango joined Amiens's youth sector, having been noticed by the youth set-up coordinator who had seen him play in Creil. In September 2020, he was bought by Juventus for a fee of 3 million euros. He made his professional debut on 3 September 2022, in a 2–0 win against Trento, playing for Juventus Next Gen.

Biography 
Son of a Cameroonian father and of French mother, Nzouango has two sisters and two brothers, one of which is twin.

Style of play 
Nzouango is a defender who can play either as a centre-back or full-back.

Career statistics

Notes

References 

Living people
2003 births
French footballers
Association football central defenders
Association football fullbacks
Amiens SC players
Juventus F.C. players
Juventus Next Gen players
Serie C players
French expatriate footballers
French expatriate sportspeople in Italy
Expatriate footballers in Italy